Luis Chavarría (born March 26, 1970 in Chile) is a retired Chilean football midfielder. His last team was Fernández Vial.

Personal life
He is the uncle of the former footballer Luis Cabezas.

References

External links

 Luis Chavarria's Profile at BDFA.com website

1970 births
People from Monte Águila
Living people
Chilean footballers
Chile international footballers
Malleco Unido footballers
C.D. Arturo Fernández Vial footballers
Deportes Concepción (Chile) footballers
Universidad de Chile footballers
C.D. Huachipato footballers
Tercera División de Chile players
Chilean Primera División players
Primera B de Chile players
Association football midfielders